An autotelic is someone or something that has a purpose in, and not apart from, itself.

Origin
The word "autotelic" derives from the Greek αὐτοτελής (autotelēs), formed from αὐτός (autos, "self") and τέλος (telos, "end" or "goal").

The Oxford English Dictionary cites the word's earliest use in 1901 (Baldwin, Dictionary of Philosophy and Psychology, I 96/1), and also cites a 1932 use by T. S. Eliot .

Use
Mihaly Csikszentmihalyi describes people who are internally driven, and who as such may exhibit a sense of purpose and curiosity, as autotelic. This is different from being externally driven, in which case things such as comfort, money, power, or fame are the motivating force. Csikszentmihalyi writes:An autotelic person needs few material possessions and little entertainment, comfort, power, or fame because so much of what he or she does is already rewarding. Because such persons experience flow in work, in family life, when interacting with people, when eating, even when alone with nothing to do, they depend less on external rewards that keep others motivated to go on with a life of routines. They are more autonomous and independent because they cannot be as easily manipulated with threats or rewards from the outside. At the same time, they are more involved with everything around them because they are fully immersed in the current of life.A. Bartlett Giamatti characterizes sports, such as baseball, as autotelic activities: "that is, their goal is the full exercise of themselves, for their own sake".

Yvor Winters quotes from Eliot's aesthetic theory including autotelic, and criticizes:Art, then, is about itself, but this information does not help me to answer my questions, for I do not understand it. What, for example, would Pope or Dante have understood if this statement had been made to them regarding the poems which I have just mentioned? Or what can we understand with regard to these poems? About all we can deduce from such a passage is that the artist does not really know what he is doing; a doctrine which we shall find suggested and elucidated elsewhere, and which leads directly to the plainest kind of determinism.

See also
Egregore
End in itself
Flow (psychology)
Ikigai
Intrinsic motivation
Teleology

References

External links
 

Personality traits
Words and phrases describing personality